Caraghnan Parish, New South Wales is  a bounded rural locality in Coonamble Shire and a civil parish of Gowen County, New South Wales.

The parish located at 31°17′54″S 149°01′04″ is in the Warrumbungle National Park.

References

Localities in New South Wales
Geography of New South Wales
Central West (New South Wales)